Albert Humphries (September 26, 1880 – September 21, 1945), was a professional baseball player who played pitcher in the Major Leagues from -. He would play for the Cincinnati Reds, Chicago Cubs, and Philadelphia Phillies.

External links

1880 births
1945 deaths
People from California, Pennsylvania
Major League Baseball pitchers
Baseball players from Pennsylvania
Chicago Cubs players
Cincinnati Reds players
Philadelphia Phillies players
Minor league baseball managers
Charleroi (minor league baseball) players
Charleroi Cherios players
Grand Rapids Wolverines players
Scranton Miners players
Richmond Climbers players
Kansas City Blues (baseball) players
Louisville Colonels (minor league) players
Orlando Caps players
Lakeland Highlanders players
Daytona Beach Islanders players
Orlando Bulldogs players